William Clark Fownes Jr. (October 2, 1877 – July 4, 1950) was an American amateur golfer. His father, Henry Fownes, founded and designed Oakmont Country Club.

Fownes won the 1910 U.S. Amateur at The Country Club in Brookline, Massachusetts. He defeated Chick Evans (winner in 1916 and 1920) in the semi-finals, 1 up, after being down two with four holes to play. He then defeated Warren Wood in the final, 4 and 3.

Fownes was the playing-captain of the first U.S. Walker Cup team in 1922. He guide the team to victory and played again on the team in 1924. He also won the Pennsylvania Amateur four times.

Fownes served as president on the United States Golf Association from 1926 to 1927.

Fownes, along with A.W. Tillinghast, George C. Thomas, Jr., Hugh Wilson, George Crump, and William Flynn together made up the "Philadelphia School" of golf course architecture. Together, the group designed over 300 courses, 27 of which are on in the top 100 golf courses in the world.

Amateur wins
1910 U.S. Amateur, Pennsylvania Amateur
1912 Pennsylvania Amateur
1913 Pennsylvania Amateur
1916 Pennsylvania Amateur

U.S. national team appearances
Walker Cup: 1922 (winners, playing captain), 1924 (winners)

References

American male golfers
Amateur golfers
Golf administrators
Golfers from Pittsburgh
1877 births
1950 deaths